The 280th Street Bridge is a historic structure located southwest of Independence, Iowa, United States. The Buchanan County Board of Supervisors contracted with D.H. Young, a contractor from Manchester, Iowa, to build eight bridges for $3,304.70. This bridge is a steel, pin-connected king post pony truss, that has a timber stringer approach span. It was listed on the National Register of Historic Places in 1998.

References

Bridges completed in 1898
Bridges in Buchanan County, Iowa
National Register of Historic Places in Buchanan County, Iowa
Road bridges on the National Register of Historic Places in Iowa
Truss bridges in Iowa
Steel bridges in the United States